As of November 2022, Swiss leisure airline Edelweiss Air operates to destinations on five continents:

Destinations

Notes

References

Lists of airline destinations